The 2018 Quezon City Capitals season is the 1st season of the franchise in the Maharlika Pilipinas Basketball League (MPBL).

Key dates
 January 25, 2018: Inaugural season of the Maharlika Pilipinas Basketball League (MPBL) starts.

Roster

Anta Rajah Cup

Eliminations

Standings

Game log

|- style="background:#bfb;"
| 1
| January 30
| Bataan
| W 87–69
| Jessie James Collado (18)
| Andrew Estrella (10)
| Andrew Estrella (10)
| Bulacan Capitol Gymnasium
| 1–0

|- style="background:#bfb;"
| 2
| February 6
| Imus
| W 84–75
| Jessie James Collado (17)
| Jessie James Collado (8)
| Hesed Gabo (4)
| JCSGO Seed Dome
| 2–0
|- style="background:#bfb;"
| 3
| February 10
| Navotas
| W 87–78
| Jessie James Collado (16)
| Jessie James Collado (19)
| Gian Abrigo (6)
| Imus City Sports Complex
| 3–0
|- style="background:#bfb;"
| 4
| February 15
| Parañaque
| W 64–54
| Peejay Barua (16)
| Gian Abrigo (20)
| Gabo, Tayongtong (3)
| Olivares College Gymnasium
| 4–0
|- style="background:#fcc;"
| 5
| February 20
| Muntinlupa
| L 87–103
| Jomar Santos (16)
| Gian Abrigo (12)
| Andrew Estrella (5)
| Muntinlupa Sports Complex
| 4–1
|- style="background:#bfb;"
| 6
| February 24
| Bulacan
| W 95–81
| Abrigo, Tayongtong (15)
| Jay Collado (12)
| Hesed Gabo (5)
| Bulacan Capitol Gymnasium
| 5–1

|- style="background:#bfb;"
| 7
| March 1
| Caloocan
| W 90–89
| Estrella, Tayongtong (20)
| Collado, Santos (14)
| John Marco Tayongtong (6)
| JCSGO Seed Dome
| 6–1
|- style="background:#fcc;"
| 8
| March 8
| Batangas
| L 68–77
| Jay Collado (22)
| Gian Abrigo (14)
| Abrigo, Gabo, Estrella (3)
| Caloocan Sports Complex
| 6–2
|- style="background:#fcc;"
| 9
| March 15
| Valenzuela
| L 79–84
| John Marco Tayongtong (22)
| John Marco Tayongtong (11)
| Hesed Gabo (8)
| Valenzuela Astrodome
| 6–3

Playoffs

Brackets

Game log

|- style="background:#fcc;"
| 1
| March 20
| Valenzuela
| L 89–96
| Jay Collado (19)
| Gian Abrigo (13)
| Hesed Gabo (9)
| Batangas City Coliseum
| 0–1
|- style="background:#bfb;"
| 2
| March 24
| Valenzuela
| W 76–68
| Hesed Gabo (17)
| Jay Collado (10)
| Abrigo, Estrella (3)
| Valenzuela Astrodome
| 1–1
|- style="background:#fcc;"
| 3
| April 3
| Valenzuela
| L 72–74
| Peejay Barua (23)
| Jay Collado (8)
| Hesed Gabo (7)
| Bulacan Capitol Gymnasium
| 1–2

Datu Cup

Standings

Game log

|- style="background:#fcc;"
| 1
| June 13
| Batangas City
| L 90–95
| Jay Collado (21)
| Jay Collado (12)
| Tayongtong, Gabo (6)
| Caloocan Sports Complex
| 0–1
|- style="background:#fcc;"
| 2
| June 26
| Davao Occidental
| L 78–90
| Jeff Morillo (15)
| Jay Collado (9)
| Hesed Gabo (7)
| Pasig Sports Center
| 0–2

|- style="background:#bfb;"
| 3
| July 5
| General Santos
| W 77–72
| Jojo Duncil (14)
| Jay Collado (8)
| Hesed Gabo (8)
| Blue Eagle Gym
| 1–2
|- style="background:#d3d3d3;"
| 
| July 17
| Imus
| colspan=6| Postponed (Inclement weather) 
|- style="background:#fcc;"
| 4
| July 26
| Marikina
| L 74–78
| Duncil, Estrella (14)
| Jeff Morillo (8)
| Joco Tayongtong (4)
| Pasig Sports Center
| 1–3

|- style="background:#fcc;"
| 5
| August 8
| Bataan
| L 68–101
| Jay Collado (15)
| Ramon Mabayo (6)
| Hesed Gabo (8)
| Blue Eagle Gym
| 1–4
|- style="background:#d3d3d3;"
| 
| August 18
| Makati
| colspan=6| Postponed (Failure to get clearance)

Playoffs

Brackets

References

Quezon City Capitals seasons
Quezon City Capitals Season, 2018